is a private junior women's college in Yonezawa, Yamagata, Japan, established in 1952.

External links
 Official website 

Japanese junior colleges
Educational institutions established in 1952
Private universities and colleges in Japan
Universities and colleges in Yamagata Prefecture
1952 establishments in Japan
Yonezawa, Yamagata